Attorney General Hastings may refer to:

Patrick Hastings (1880–1952), Attorney General for England and Wales
Serranus Clinton Hastings (1814–1893), Attorney General of California

See also
General Hastings (disambiguation)